This is an incomplete list of Filipino full-length films, both mainstream and independently produced, released in theaters and cinemas in  2017.

Top ten grossing films
The highest-grossing Filipino films released in 2017, by domestic box office gross revenue, are as follows:

1.  My Ex and Whys earned an estimated total of ₱ 400,000,000 which includes international gross.
2.  Can't Help Falling in Love earned an estimated total of ₱ 320,000,000 which includes international gross.
3.  Finally Found Someone earned an estimated total of ₱ 316,500,000 which includes international gross.
4.  Unexpectedly Yours earned an estimated total of ₱ 218,000,000 which includes international gross.

Films

January–March

April–June

July–September

October–December

Awards

Local
The following first list shows the Best Picture winners at the four major film awards: FAMAS Awards, Gawad Urian Awards, Luna Awards and Star Awards; and at the three major film festivals: Metro Manila Film Festival, Cinemalaya and Cinema One Originals. The second list shows films with the most awards won from the four major film awards and a breakdown of their total number of awards per award ceremony.

References 

Lists of 2017 films by country or language